Norgaygang Gewog (Dzongkha: ནོར་རྒྱས་སྒང་) is a gewog (village block) of Samtse District, Bhutan. It is located at the extreme northwest of the Samtse District bordering on India's West Bengal (Kalimpong) and Sikkim (East Sikkim) provinces. It has the Haa District to the northeast and Samtse's Tendruk Gewog to the southeast.

The Norgaygang gewog is immediately to the south of the Zompelri ridge and Mount Gipmochi, which have been subject to the India-China-Bhutan border dispute. The Dichu (Jaldhaka) river flows through the gewog along with its numerous tributaries. The largest of the tributaries is Asam Khola rising below the Mount Gipmochi.

It has 19 villages in 6 Chiwogs. In 2012, it had a population of 3,381.

References

External links
 Norgaygang Gewog marked on OpenStreetMap, retrieved 4 December 2021.
 Dichu river basin marked on OpenStreetMap, retrieved 4 December 2021.

Gewogs of Bhutan
Samtse District